USS Felicia (PYc-35) was a yacht acquired by the United States Navy during World War II. Felicia was outfitted as a patrol craft by the Navy, and was assigned to patrol the New England waters. She was based out of Newport, Rhode Island until 16 December 1943 when she was based out of Boston, Massachusetts, as a training ship for naval cadets at Harvard University. Post-war she was decommissioned and transferred to the Maritime Commission.

Built by Bath Iron Works in Maine 
The second ship to be so named by the U.S. Navy, Felicia (PYC-35) was built in 1931 by Bath Iron Works, Bath, Maine; purchased by the Navy on 8 April 1942; and commissioned on 27 June 1942.

World War II service

Patrol Craft operations 
Felicia was assigned to the 2nd Naval District and was based at Newport, Rhode Island, out of which she sailed on anti-submarine patrols, until 16 December 1943.

Assigned as a training ship 
From that time, she operated locally out of Boston, Massachusetts, harbor as a school ship, training student naval officers enrolled at Harvard University.

Post-war decommissioning and disposal 
She was decommissioned on 10 August 1945, and transferred to the Maritime Commission on 23 October 1945.

References
 
 

Individual yachts
Patrol vessels of the United States Navy
Harvard University
Ships built in Bath, Maine
1931 ships
World War II naval ships of the United States